Pisaura is a genus of Eurasian spiders in the family Pisauridae.

Description 
Pisaura (at least the European species) vary in colouration from yellow and bright brown to mostly red-brown and grey or black. A distinct, bright stripe runs down the middle of the prosoma. The opisthosoma is long, slender and tapering posteriorly. On the dorsal surface of the opisthosoma is a wide, jagged stripe with dark margins. The posterior cheliceral furrow margin has two or three teeth.

Ecology 
Spiders of this genus are hunters on the ground or on vegetation.

Taxonomy
The genus name Pisaura was first published by Eugène Simon in 1886. In 1757, Carl Alexander Clerck had described a species of spider under the name Araneus mirabilis; later authors placed the species either in Dolomedes or more usually in Ocyale. Simon stated that the type species of Ocyale was entirely different from "Ocyale mirabilis", so placed the species in a new genus as Pisaura mirabilis. In the same publication, Simon also described Pisaura valida, later placed in Afropisaura as Afropisaura valida.

Species
, the World Spider Catalog accepted the following species:

Pisaura acoreensis Wunderlich, 1992 – Azores
Pisaura anahitiformis Kishida, 1910 – Japan
Pisaura ancora Paik, 1969 – Russia, China, Korea
Pisaura bicornis Zhang & Song, 1992 – China, Japan
Pisaura consocia (O. Pickard-Cambridge, 1872) – Turkey, Israel, Lebanon, Syria
Pisaura lama Bösenberg & Strand, 1906 – Russia, China, Korea, Japan
Pisaura mirabilis (Clerck, 1757) (type species) – Palearctic
Pisaura novicia (L. Koch, 1878) – Mediterranean to Central Asia
Pisaura orientalis Kulczyński, 1913 – Mediterranean
Pisaura podilensis Patel & Reddy, 1990 – India
Pisaura quadrilineata (Lucas, 1838) – Canary Is., Madeira
Pisaura sublama Zhang, 2000 – China
Pisaura swamii Patel, 1987 – India

Gallery

References

Further reading 

 Blandin, P. (1976) Etudes sur les Pisauridae africaines VI. Définition des genres Pisaura Simon, 1885, Pisaurellus Roewer,1961, Afropisaura n. gen. et mise au point sur les espèces des genres Afropisaura and Pisaurellus (Araneae - Pisauridae -Pisaurinae). Revue de Zoologie africaine, 90, 917–939. 

Pisauridae
Araneomorphae genera
Spiders of Asia